Oxalis palmifrons is a species of the wood sorrel family, Oxalidaceae, native to South Africa's Northern and Western Cape provinces.

Description 
The species exhibits a dark brown bulb, short (2 cm) petioles, and palmate leaflets (over 20 in number). It occasionally flowers with white or yellow petals.

Habitat 

As described by T. M. Salter, the species "grows in flat open spaces and the bulbs, which lie at a depth of about 10 inches, in hard clayey soil, are usually embedded amongst stones". It is endemic to South Africa's Northern and Western Cape provinces.

Taxonomy 

The species is a member of the Oxalis tomentosa alliance, which includes O. oligophylla Salter, O. hygrophila Dreyer, O. tomentosa L., O. palmifrons Salter, and O. saltusbelli.

References

External links 
 Journal of South African Botany

palmifrons
Flora of the Cape Provinces